Zig-Zaggin' Through Ghostland is the fourth album by The Radiators, and their third studio album.

Overview
After the moderate success of their major label debut, Law of the Fish, the Radiators returned to the studio to create Zig-Zaggin' Through Ghostland.  Described as "slightly more aggressive" than its predecessor by Allmusic, the album was also slightly more successful, peaking at #122 on the Billboard 200.  The song "Confidential" made it all the way to #8 on the Mainstream Rock Tracks.

Track listing

Credits

 Ed Volker – keyboards, vocals
 Dave Malone – guitars, vocals
 Camile Baudoin – guitars, vocals
 Reggie Scanlan – bass
 Frank Bua Jr. – drums
 Glenn Sears – percussion
 Rodney Mills – producer, engineer

References

The Radiators (American band) albums
1989 albums
Albums produced by Rodney Mills
Epic Records albums